Bohumil Hájek was a male international table tennis player from Czechoslovakia. 

He won a bronze medal at the 1930 World Table Tennis Championships in the men's team event.

See also
 List of table tennis players
 List of World Table Tennis Championships medalists

References

Czechoslovak table tennis players
World Table Tennis Championships medalists